Scoparia congestalis is a moth in the family Crambidae. It was described by Francis Walker in 1859. It is found in Japan, Sri Lanka, Taiwan, Korea, Pakistan, Russia and China (Anhui, Fujian, Gansu, Guangxi, Guizhou, Henan, Hong Kong, Hubei, Hunan, Jiangxi, Shaanxi, Shanghai, Sichuan, Tianjin, Xizang, Yunnan, Zhejiang).

References

Moths described in 1859
Scorparia